Polyarny is a rural locality (a selo), one of two settlements, in addition to Udachny, the administrative centre of the Town, in the Town of Udachny of Mirninsky District in the Sakha Republic, Russia. Its population as of the 2010 Census was 0; down from 429 recorded during the 2002 Census.

References

Notes

Sources
Official website of the Sakha Republic. Registry of the Administrative-Territorial Divisions of the Sakha Republic. Mirninsky District. 

Rural localities in Mirninsky District